Players and pairs who neither have high enough rankings nor receive wild cards may participate in a qualifying tournament held one week before the annual Wimbledon Tennis Championships.

Qualifiers

  Larry Scott
  Richey Reneberg
  Larry Stefanki
  Des Tyson
  Mark Woodforde
  Marc Flur
  Andrei Olhovskiy
  Gary Muller
  Ken Flach
  Simon Youl
  Mike Bauer
  Tony Mmoh
  Christian Saceanu
  Leif Shiras
  Alexander Volkov
  Roberto Saad

Qualifying draw

First qualifier

Second qualifier

Third qualifier

Fourth qualifier

Fifth qualifier

Sixth qualifier

Seventh qualifier

Eighth qualifier

Ninth qualifier

Tenth qualifier

Eleventh qualifier

Twelfth qualifier

Thirteenth qualifier

Fourteenth qualifier

Fifteenth qualifier

Sixteenth qualifier

External links

 1987 Wimbledon Championships – Men's draws and results at the International Tennis Federation

Men's Singles Qualifying
Wimbledon Championship by year – Men's singles qualifying